Daeya-dong is neighbourhood of Gunpo, Gyeonggi Province, South Korea.

External links
 Daeya-dong 

Neighbourhoods in Gunpo